Anouk Renière-Lafrenière (born February 15, 1983) is a Canadian synchronized swimmer. She won a bronze medal at a 2002 world cup tournament in Zurich, Switzerland in the duet event. She was a member of the 2004 Olympic team in Athens, finishing fifth.

References

1983 births
Canadian synchronized swimmers
French Quebecers
Living people
Olympic synchronized swimmers of Canada
Swimmers from Montreal
Synchronized swimmers at the 2004 Summer Olympics